Drop dead can refer to:

Arts, entertainment, and media

Music

Groups and labels
 Drop Dead! (Argentine band), an alternative rock band from Buenos Aires
 Drop Dead, Gorgeous, a melodic metalcore band
 Dropdead, a hardcore punk band of Rhode Island

Albums
 Drop Dead (Siege album), a 1984 LP by the hardcore punk band Siege

Songs
 "Drop Dead", B-side to the single Happy House by Siouxsie and the Banshees 
 "Drop Dead", song by the band Electro Hippies
 "Drop Dead", 2020 song by artist Grandson, with its 2021 remix featuring Kesha and Travis Barker
 "Drop Dead", song by Child's play from the EP Ruff House

Other uses in arts, entertainment, and media
 "Drop Dead", a 1956 science fiction short story by Clifford D. Simak
 Drop Dead (dice game), a dice game
 Drop Dead Diva, TV series
 Drop Dead Festival, an annual Deathrock festival held in New York
 Drop Dead Fred, a 1991 comedy fantasy film starring Rik Mayall

Other uses
 Drop dead date, a time limit in contract law or a court order
 Drop dead (computing), a informal name for an illegal instruction on the Motorola 6800 CPU

See also
 Dead drop, espionage technique of leaving an item to be collected by another who knows it being there to be a secret